Encadenada (English title:Chained) is a Mexican telenovela produced by Televisa and transmitted by Telesistema Mexicano.

Cast 
Ofelia Guilmáin
José Gálvez
Andrea Palma
Guillermo Murray
Emilia Carranza
Luis Bayardo
Jacqueline Andere as Laura
Mario García González

References

External links

Mexican telenovelas
1962 telenovelas
Televisa telenovelas
1962 Mexican television series debuts
1962 Mexican television series endings
Spanish-language telenovelas